John David Bamber (born 1 February 1959) is an English former professional footballer. He played for nine clubs during a fifteen-year career. Over half of his 148 goals in the Football League were scored during his three spells with Blackpool.

Career
Born in Prescot, Lancashire, Bamber played for Leicester University and St. Helens Town in youth and junior football. Bamber began his professional career at Blackpool in 1979. His starting debut came on 29 December 1979, in a loss at Chester City. He scored his first goal for the Seasiders on 7 April 1980, in a league encounter against Carlisle United at Bloomfield Road. During the next four years of struggle, Bamber scored 36 goals in 100 games in all competitions under four different managers. Coventry City came in for his services prior to the 1983–84 season. Bamber moved to Walsall later in 1983, before a short stay at Portsmouth in 1984.

In 1985, he joined Swedish side Trelleborgs FF, making just four league appearances, scoring one goal, before moving back to England to play for Swindon Town later that same year. In two years with the Robins he made 108 league appearances, scoring 31 goals.

In 1988, he joined Watford with whom he made 18 league appearances and scored three goals before moving to Stoke City later that same year. In 1989, he joined Hull City, before returning to Blackpool in 1990 to bring his fifteen-year playing career to a close. He was re-signed by the Seasiders initially on loan, in December 1990, by the departing Graham Carr, who was immediately replaced by his assistant, Billy Ayre. "I signed for Graham Carr on the Thursday and got on the coach to go down to Hereford to find out that he'd been sacked," Bamber explained in 2012. "Nobody seemed to know what was going on. Billy Ayre got on the coach further down the M6."  A month later, on 5 January 1991, shortly before kick-off in an FA Cup match against Tottenham Hotspur, new Seasiders manager Billy Ayre agreed to pay Hull £50,000 for Bamber.

In his second spell at Blackpool, Bamber played at Wembley twice in successive seasons (1990–91 and 1991–92), both in the play-off finals, and both of which went to penalty shoot-outs. In the first final, against Torquay United, Bamber put his spot-kick wide of Gareth Howells' left-hand post, handing promotion to the Tangerines' south-coast opponents. Following this loss, the Gulls named their fanzine Bamber's Right Foot, in mockery of the striker's miss.

The following year, however, Blackpool were victorious in the same manner against Scunthorpe United and were promoted to the new Division Two. Bamber, who played despite needing an operation on his knee (preserving his record of being an ever-present throughout the season), scored Blackpool's normal-time goal. He did not partake in the penalty shoot-out. A persistent pelvic injury forced Bamber to retire in 1994.

Blackpool F.C. Hall of Fame 
Bamber was inducted into the Hall of Fame at Bloomfield Road, when it was officially opened by former Blackpool player Jimmy Armfield in April 2006. Organised by the Blackpool Supporters Association, Blackpool fans around the world voted on their all-time heroes. Five players from each decade are inducted; Bamber is in the 1990s.

Post-retirement
After retiring from football, Bamber remained in Blackpool with his family, becoming a property developer.

Career statistics
Source:

A.  The "Other" column constitutes appearances and goals in the Anglo-Scottish Cup, Football League Group Cup, Football League play-offs, Football League Trophy and Full Members Cup.

Honours
Swindon Town
Division Four: 1985–86
Division Three play-offs: 1986–87

Blackpool
Division Four play-offs: 1991–92

Individual
PFA Team of the Year: 1991–92 Fourth Division

References

Further reading

External links
 
 
 Profile at VitalSwindon
 "Home win for Pool legend Bamber" – Blackpool Gazette

1959 births
Living people
Sportspeople from Prescot
English footballers
Association football forwards
St Helens Town A.F.C. players
Blackpool F.C. players
Coventry City F.C. players
Walsall F.C. players
Portsmouth F.C. players
Trelleborgs FF players
Swindon Town F.C. players
Watford F.C. players
Stoke City F.C. players
Hull City A.F.C. players
Pilkington F.C. players
Alumni of De Montfort University
English Football League players
Allsvenskan players
English expatriate footballers
Expatriate footballers in Sweden
English expatriate sportspeople in Sweden